Solaborate /ˈsōˈlabəˌrāte/ is a communication and collaboration platform for professionals and consumers. It allows them to do video calls, share documents, screencast and screenshare, remotely monitor their home or office. Solaborate is a combination of the words "social" and "collaboration". Solaborate has both software and hardware in the form of the HELLO Messenger and HELLO Communication Device.

History

Solaborate's CEO Labinot Bytyqi, founded the company in 2012. Solaborate is headquartered in Clearwater, Florida.
In April 2013, Solaborate launched its private beta, and announced it has raised $1 million from angel investors.
In October 2013, at TechEd Las Vegas, Solaborate officially launched its public beta.

HELLO 

In July 2016, Solaborate launched a Kickstarter campaign for HELLO 1. HELLO is a voice controlled device that can be used for video conferencing, wireless screensharing, live broadcasting, and security surveillance. The device runs on Android and is engineered with an array of four smart microphones, a 4K video sensor and quad-core processor. It also features a built-in accelerometer and tilting lens.
In January 2018, Solaborate announced HELLO 2 at CES 2018.

Awards

People's Choice Award at SAP Palo Alto

In 2013, Solaborate has been awarded the people's choice award at SAP's Palo Alto, during the 10th startup forum.

Best in Show Award at WebRTC Conference and Expo

In 2013, Solaborate has received the "Best in Show" award at the WebRTC Conference and Expo hosted by TMC in Atlanta, Ga

Technology
Solaborate is built in Microsoft Windows Azure Cloud Computing, using HTML5, WebSockets and WebRTC protocol for real time communication. Solaborate runs on SAP HANA platform, to provide users with real-time information on their network.

Features
Features include:
profiles for professionals, companies, products, and services
messaging, chat, and video
screen sharing
creating blogs
real-time analytics
file sharing and document organization

In October 2013, Solaborate released a mobile app for Android.

In September 2014, Solaborate launched Solaborate app for Windows 8.1.
The app integrates most of the same features and capabilities as the web and it is supported in x86, x64 and ARMS processors.

In October 2018, Solaborate launched their second generation of HELLO.

See also
LinkedIn
XING
Viadeo
Social media
Social network
Social software
Business network
List of social networking websites

References

Companies based in Los Angeles
Professional networks
Social networking services